Masoud Pezeshkian (born 29 September 1954 in Mahabad from Azerbaijani family) is an Iranian reformist politician who is currently representing Tabriz, Osku and Azarshahr electoral district in the Parliament of Iran and serves as its First Deputy Speaker since 29 May 2016.
He was Minister of Health between 2001 and 2005 in the cabinet of President Mohammad Khatami.

Career 
He was the chancellor of Tabriz University of Medical Sciences for 7 years. He is a heart surgeon and an academic member of Tabriz University of Medical Sciences at the present time. He is elected as one of Iranian parliament members from Tabriz in 2008 election. He had a speech on condemnation of violence against fraud in Iranian presidential election on June 30, 2009 in Iran parliament.  In 2010, he failed in his bid to become deputy speaker of parliament. He is also a member of Iran-Turkey Friendship society.

Views 
Pezeshkian supports teaching of Azerbaijani language in Iranian schools.

During the Mahsa Amini protests in September 2022, Pezeshkian said in an interview, "It is our fault. We want to implement religious faith through the use of force. This is scientifically impossible."

COVID-19 outbreak 

On 3 March 2020, during the COVID-19 pandemic in Iran, Pezeshkian claimed that the figures reported by Iran’s health ministry are "not real".

References

Living people
Deputies of Tabriz, Osku and Azarshahr
Government ministers of Iran
People from Tabriz
Members of the 9th Islamic Consultative Assembly
Members of the 8th Islamic Consultative Assembly
Iranian surgeons
Iranian cardiac surgeons
People from Mahabad
1954 births
Iranian reformists
Tabriz University of Medical Sciences alumni
University of Tehran alumni
Members of the 10th Islamic Consultative Assembly
Members of the 11th Islamic Consultative Assembly
First Deputies of Islamic Consultative Assembly
Academic staff of Tabriz University of Medical Sciences
Impeached Iranian officials